Institut Curie is one of the leading medical, biological and biophysical research centres in the world. 
It is a private non-profit foundation operating a research center on biophysics, cell biology and oncology and a hospital specialized in treatment of cancer. It is located in Paris, France.

Institut Curie is member of EU-LIFE, an alliance of leading life sciences research centres in Europe.

Research
The institute now operates several research units in cooperation with national research institutions CNRS and INSERM.
There are several hundred research staff at the institute. Institut Curie does not offer undergraduate degrees, but awards PhDs and employs many postdoctoral students alongside its permanent staff. Institut Curie is a constituent college (associate member) of University PSL.

Hospital
Institut Curie runs the Hôpital Claudius Régaud, a hospital specializing in cancer.
The institute also operates the proton therapy center at Orsay, one of the few such facilities in the world.

History

The Institut du Radium, a giant laboratory for Marie Skłodowska–Curie, was founded in 1909 by the University of Paris and Institut Pasteur. The Institut du Radium had two sections. The Curie laboratory, directed by Maria Skłodowska-Curie, was dedicated to physics and chemistry research. The Pasteur laboratory, directed by Dr. Claudius Regaud, was studying the biological and medical effects of radioactivity. After receiving a joint Nobel Prize with her husband Pierre in 1903, Maria Skłodowska-Curie won a second Nobel Prize for Chemistry in 1911. During World War One, Maria Skłodowska-Curie used it to teach nurses about radiology.

Maria Skłodowska-Curie and Claudius Regaud established the Foundation Curie in 1920, a public interest institution. The Foundation's purpose was to fund the Institut du Radium's activities and contribute to the development of its therapeutic component.
A first hospital opened in 1922. At the clinic, Dr. Regaud and his team developed innovative treatments combining surgery and radiation therapy to treat cancer. The Curie Foundation became a model for cancer centers around the world. Curie laboratory continued to play an important role in physics and chemistry research. In 1934, Maria Skłodowska-Curie's daughter Irène and her son-in-law Frédéric Joliot-Curie discovered artificial radioactivity. In 1935, it was recognized with a Nobel Prize in Chemistry. The Institut du Radium and the Fondation Curie merged in 1970. It became Institut Curie. The Institut has three missions: research, teaching and treating cancer. The original building of Curies Laboratory from 1914 now houses the Musée Curie.

Nobel Laureates
Five Nobel prizes are attached to the institute's researchers.

Maria Skłodowska-Curie, Physics, 1903
Maria Skłodowska-Curie. Chemistry, 1911
Pierre Curie, Physics, 1903
Irène and Frédéric Joliot-Curie, Chemistry, 1935
Pierre-Gilles de Gennes, Physics, 1991

Famous alumni
Maria Skłodowska-Curie, Physics
Irène Joliot-Curie
Frédéric Joliot-Curie
Pierre-Gilles de Gennes
Ștefania Mărăcineanu

External links
 Official site of Institut Curie
 Institut Curie's history (official website)
 Curie Museum's Website

Notes

Medical research institutes in France
Hospitals in Paris
Hospitals established in 1921
1921 establishments in France